Asteriscus sericeus, the Canary Island daisy, is a species in the daisy family endemic to the Canary Islands.

References

sericeus
Flora of the Canary Islands
Plants described in 1836